Lampromyia is a genus of wormlion in the family Vermileonidae.

Species
Lampromyia canariensis Macquart, 1839
Lampromyia cylindrica (Fabricius, 1794)
Lampromyia fortunata Stuckenberg, 1971
Lampromyia funebris Dufour, 1850
Lampromyia hemmigseni Stuckenberg, 1971
Lampromyia iberica Stuckenberg, 1998
Lampromyia lecerfi Séguy, 1930
Lampromyia namaquaensis Stuckenberg, 1961
Lampromyia nigripennis Séguy, 1930
Lampromyia pallida Macquart, 1835
Lampromyia pilosula Engel, 1929
Lampromyia rebecca Stuckenberg, 1996

References

Diptera of Africa
Diptera of Europe
Brachycera genera
Taxa named by Pierre-Justin-Marie Macquart
Vermileonomorpha